Ernest Lowell "Dick" Romney (February 12, 1895 – February 5, 1969) was an American football, basketball and baseball player and coach, track athlete, and college athletics administrator.  He served as the head football coach and athletic director at the Agricultural College of Utah, now Utah State University, from 1918 to 1949, compiling a career college football record of 128–91–16.  Romney was also the head basketball coach at Utah Agricultural from 1919 to 1941, tallying a college basketball mark of 224–158.  He served as the commissioner of the Skyline Conference from 1949 to 1960. Romney was inducted into the College Football Hall of Fame as a coach in 1954 and was elected to the Helms Athletic Foundation and Hall of Fame as a football coach in 1958.

Early life, family, and playing career
Romney was born in Salt Lake City to George Romney and Hannah Ottinger Romney.  "Dick" was a nickname to given him by his mother.  He married Elizabeth ("Beth") Horlick of Salt Lake City in 1917.

He graduated from the University of Utah where he lettered in football (playing as a running back), basketball, baseball, and track.  He was a member of the A.A.U. national championship basketball team of 1916.  In 1916, he was chosen by the Helms Foundation as an All-American Collegiate and A.A.U. Basketball player.

As a member of the U.S. Army's 362nd Infantry, Romney played halfback for the Fort Lewis football team, scoring the only touchdown in a loss to Mare Island's team in the wartime 1918 Rose Bowl.

Romney's brothers—G. Ottinger "Ott" Romney, W. W. "Woody" Romney, Milton "Mitt" Romney and Floyd Romney—were all gifted athletes and four were coaches. Ott coached the champion 'Golden Bobcats' (Basketball, 1928) at Montana State Agricultural College, now Montana State University, Bozeman. Floyd played football for Ott at Montana State, and went on to a long coaching career at East High School in Salt Lake City, Utah. Mitt played college football at Utah and Chicago as a quarterback and later coached at Texas and for the Racine Cardinals.  From 1925 to 1928, Mitt was a quarterback for the Chicago Bears of the NFL. Mitt Romney is a first cousin to former Governor George Romney of Michigan, and his son, Mitt Romney of Massachusetts, was named for him.

Coaching career
Between 1925 and 1948, Romney organized and operated a summer school for football and basketball coaches that he ran in Logan, Utah. Noteworthy football speakers included Knute Rockne, Pop Warner, "Pappy" Waldorf, "Fritz" Kreisler,  Clark Schaunnessy and Henry Frankel. Basketball greats presented at Romney's clinics.

Later years and honors
A new football stadium built in 1968 (replacing an earlier facility built in 1927, also named for him) at Utah State University was renamed Romney Stadium. Romney Stadium honored the Hall of Fame coach from 1969 to 2015, when it was renamed for a corporate sponsor.

On February 5, 1969, Romney died from a heart attack at his home in Salt Lake City, one week before his 74th birthday, at the age of 73.

Head coaching record

Football

Basketball

References

External links
 
 

1895 births
1969 deaths
American men's basketball players
Mountain States Conference commissioners
Utah State Aggies athletic directors
Utah State Aggies football coaches
Utah State Aggies men's basketball coaches
Utah Utes baseball players
Utah Utes football players
Utah Utes men's basketball players
All-American college men's basketball players
College Football Hall of Fame inductees
Sportspeople from Salt Lake City
Coaches of American football from Utah
Players of American football from Salt Lake City
Basketball coaches from Utah
Basketball players from Salt Lake City
Baseball players from Salt Lake City
Romney family